The Tsagaantsav Formation, Tsagantsab Formation or Tsagan-Tsab Formation (Russian: Tsagaantsav Svita) is an Early Cretaceous (Hauterivian to Barremian) geologic formation in Mongolia. Indeterminate sauropod and psittacosaurid remains have been recovered from the formation. Remains of the pterosaur Noripterus, which were originally given their own genus, "Phobetor" have also been recovered from the formation.

Graham et al. 2001 reported radiometric dates of 131 and 126 Ma from the formation.

Fossil content 
The following fossils were reported from the fluvial to lacustrine sandstones and siltstones of the formation:
 Pterosaurs
 Dsungaripterus parvus
 Noripterus complicidens
 Dinosaurs
 Psittacosaurus sp.
 Sauropoda indet.
 Theropoda indet.
 Lizards
 Dorsetisauridae indet.
Insects

 Khutelchalcis gobiensis
 Eopelecinus fragilis
 E. minutus
 Praeichneumon townesi
 Eobraconus inopinatus
 Westratia femorata
 W. pachygaster
 W. pentadecamera
 Langtonius cynaricaudatus
 Eugenodiamesa makarchenkoi
 Jurochlus adustus
 Ellia khara
 Protanyderus mesozoicus
 Metatrichopteridium cladistorum
 Plectrocentropus sulis
 Eoclipsis mongolica
 Coptoclavisca nigricollinus
 Cretorabus orientalis
 Mesaclopus mongolicus
 Chinocimberis dispersus
 Megametrioxenoides longus
 Uroperla lacerata
 Trianguliperla quassa
 Aphaorus curtipes
 Juleyrodes ?gilli
 Izinabis kerzhneri
 Siberiogenites medius
 Torephemera longipes
 Leptoneta calyptrata
 Albisca tracheata
 Epeoromimus infractus
 Osmylogramma martinsoni
 Juraphididae indet.

See also 
 List of dinosaur-bearing rock formations
 List of stratigraphic units with indeterminate dinosaur fossils
 List of pterosaur-bearing stratigraphic units
 Andaikhudag Formation

References

Bibliography 

 
 
  
 

Geologic formations of Mongolia
Lower Cretaceous Series of Asia
Cretaceous Mongolia
Barremian Stage
Hauterivian Stage
Sandstone formations
Siltstone formations
Fluvial deposits
Lacustrine deposits
Paleontology in Mongolia
Formations
Formations
Formations
Formations